Dijana Ravnikar (born 4 June 1978 in Rijeka, SFR Yugoslavia) is a former Slovenian biathlete and cross-country skier of Croatian origin.

Career 
Ravnikar competed for Slovenia in the 2002 Winter Olympics in Salt Lake City, 2006 Winter Olympics in Turin and 2010 Winter Olympics in Vancouver.

In Salt Lake City he competed in the 15 km, winning 57th place and in the 4 x 7.5 km relay, where the Slovenian team came 6th.

In Turin, she performed in several disciplines. In the 7.5 km sprint she took 55th place, in 10-kilometer course she withdrew; in the 15 km she finished 30th, while in the 4 x 6 km relay, the Slovenian team was sixth.

She retired after the 2009–10 season, though she had a short-lived comeback during the 2012–13 season.

Personal life 
She currently resides in Koper and Čavle.

References

External links
 
 

1978 births
Living people
Croatian female cross-country skiers
Croatian female biathletes
Slovenian female cross-country skiers
Slovenian female biathletes
Sportspeople from Rijeka
Slovenian people of Croatian descent
Olympic biathletes of Slovenia
Biathletes at the 2002 Winter Olympics
Biathletes at the 2006 Winter Olympics
Biathletes at the 2010 Winter Olympics